Autodromo di Modena (or Aerautodromo di Modena) was a race track on the edge of Modena in Italy.

The track hosted nine editions of the Modena Grand Prix for Formula One and Formula Two racing cars, the last one in 1961. The circuit continued to host other racing events (sportcars, grand touring, Formula Junior, motorcycles) until 1975.

In the 1960s and 1970s the track also served as a test track for Ferrari and Maserati during the morning or afternoon (but not both) on week days. At other times of day it was used by residents of the adjacent military camp for driver training while maintaining its original function of airport for private flights. Ferrari driver Mike Parkes, an accomplished pilot, used to fly in regularly from England on his own craft. Despite the expansion of nearby Modena, which involved a proliferation of apartment blocks and electricity pylons, the airstrip continued to be a favoured venue for a number of local aerobatics enthusiasts until 1974.

In the early 1970s, Enzo Ferrari, aided and abetted by Maserati and Automobili Stanguellini, demanded an upgrade from the Modena Town Council and Automobile Club d'Italia, the reasoning being that the race track lacked basic safety requirements and was inadequate to test modern racing cars. The proposal was initially discussed with interest, but eventually stalled due to lack of political will. In 1972 Automobile Club d'Italia decided to invest in the nearby semi-permanent Imola circuit, effectively ending Modena's prospects of holding a modern Formula One race.

The circuit was subsequently demolished, and the site redeveloped as a public park to honour Enzo Ferrari in 1991.

In 2011 the new Modena Autodrome re-opened in the Marzaglia area close to Via Aemilia.

Modena Grand Prix
The first two editions of the Modena Grand Prix took place on a 12 km-long road track around the area where the autodrome would be eventually built. Enzo Ferrari won on both occasions. The race was then discontinued until 1938, when it took place on a shorter permutation of the circuit known as Circuito del Parco or Anello dei Viali. Tazio Nuvolari won three times. In 1947, following a serious accident that resulted in the death of five spectators, the race track was the subject of a significant number of upgrades, and the Modena Grand Prix was re-introduced in 1950. The last race was held on 3 September 1961 and was won by Stirling Moss in a Lotus 18/21.

Winners of the Modena Grand Prix

References

Motorsport venues in Italy
Defunct motorsport venues in Italy
Modena